The 2019–20 PFC CSKA Moscow season was the 28th successive season that the club play in the Russian Premier League, the highest tier of association football in Russia.

Season events
On 7 June, the calendar for the 2019–20 Russian Premier League season was released, with CSKA starting their season away to Krylia Sovetov and finishing the season at home to newly promoted Tambov. On 14 June, Timur Zhamaletdinov extended his contract with CSKA until the summer of 2020/21, and extended his loan deal with Lech Poznań until the end of the 2019/20 season. On 19 June, CSKA announced the signing of Nikola Vlašić on a five-year contract for an undisclosed fee from Everton., and that Ivan Oleynikov had left the club do join Shinnik Yaroslavl.

On 21 June, Alan Dzagoev signed a new two-year contract with CSKA, keeping him at the club until the summer of 2021. On 27 June, Arsenal Tula announced the permanent singing of Sergei Tkachyov from CSKA. On 29 June, Slaven Belupo announced that Zvonimir Šarlija had moved to CSKA Moscow, with CSKA confirming the season-long loan deal, with the first option to buy, on 1 July.

On 1 July, Vitali Zhironkin joined Baltika Kaliningrad on a season-long loan deal, whilst Semyon Matviychuk moved permanently to SKA-Khabarovsk. On 5 July, Khetag Khosonov returned to FC Tambov on loan for the 2019/20 season. On 30 July, Nikita Chernov moved to Krylia Sovetov.

On 22 August, Georgi Kyrnats moved to SKA-Khabarovsk. On 29 August, CSKA Moscow announced the signing of Cédric Gogoua on a four-year contract from Tambov. On 30 August, CSKA Moscow announced that Aleksandr Makarov had moved to Avangard Kursk on a permanent transfer.

On 2 September, Lucas Santos signed on loan from Vasco da Gama until 31 December 2019.

On 17 December, Dmitry Yefremov, Maksim Yedapin and Danil Savinykh left the club after the expiration of their contracts, whilst Konstantin Kuchayev extended his contract until 2023.

On 30 December, Vladislav Torop extended his contract with CSKA until the end of 2022.

On 9 January, CSKA Moscow announced the signing of Ilya Shkurin on a 4.5-year contract from Dynamo Brest. The following day, CSKA Moscow confirmed that Takuma Nishimura had joined Portimonense on loan for the remainder of the season, whilst Lucas Santos had returned to Vasco da Gama after his loan had expired.

On 18 January, Zvonimir Šarlija's loan with CSKA Moscow ended, with Šarlija moving on loan to Kasımpaşa from Slaven Belupo. On 20 January, Nayair Tiknizyan moved on loan to Avangard Kursk until the end of the season.

On 24 January, Danila Yanov left CSKA Moscow to join Riga FC for an undisclosed fee.

On 31 January, CSKA Moscow announced the signing of Nikita Kotin on a 3.5-year contract from Krylia Sovetov.

On 13 February, Astemir Gordyushenko left CSKA Moscow to join Torpedo Moscow.

On 16 March, CSKA's home game against Zenit St.Petersburg scheduled for 22 March, was postponed after the Mayor of Moscow banned outdoor sporting events due to the COVID-19 pandemic.

On 17 March, the Russian Premier League postponed all league fixtures until April 10 due to the COVID-19 pandemic.

On 26 March, Takuma Nishimura's loan deal at Portimonense was ended early to allow Nishimura to return to Vegalta Sendai on loan until June.

On 1 April, the Russian Football Union extended the suspension of football until 31 May.

On 15 May, the Russian Football Union announced that the Russian Premier League season would resume on 21 June.

On 20 May, CSKA announced that Viktor Goncharenko had extended his contract with the club until the summer of 2021.

On 16 June 2020, CSKA announced that youngsters Nikolay Zirikov and Yegor Teslenko had left the club at the end of their contracts, whilst Aleksei Sukharev had also left the club after his loan deal expired.

On 23 June 2020, CSKA announced that Sergei Ovchinnikov would take charge of the team for their upcoming fixture against Dynamo Moscow on 27 June due to Viktor Goncharenko feeling unwell. Later the same day, CSKA announced that Konstantin Maradishvili had extended his contract with CSKA Moscow until the summer of 2025.

On 24 June 2020, CSKA announced the signing of Gocha Gogrichiani from Rostov.

On 29 June 2020, CSKA announced that they had signed a long-term agreement with Joma to be their technical sponsor from the 2020/21 season.

On 20 July, CSKA announced that Vitali Zhironkin would return to Baltika Kaliningrad on loan for the 2020/21 season.

Squad

Out on loan

Transfers

In

Loans in

Out

Loans out

Released

Trial

Friendlies

Competitions

Premier League

Results by round

Results

League table

Russian Cup

UEFA Europa League

Group stage

Squad statistics

Appearances and goals

|-
|colspan="14"|Players away from the club on loan:

|-
|colspan="14"|Players who left CSKA Moscow during the season:

|}

Goal scorers

Clean sheets

Disciplinary record

References

PFC CSKA Moscow seasons
CSKA Moscow
CSKA Moscow